The following is a list of lacrosse teams in Canada. It includes the league(s) they play for and championships won.

National Lacrosse League
Current teams

Former teams

Major League Lacrosse
Former teams

Senior A

Major Series Lacrosse (OLA)

Current Teams

Former Teams

Western Lacrosse Association (BCLA)

Senior B

Can-Am Senior B Lacrosse League (Can-Am)

Ontario Senior B Lacrosse League (OLA)
Current Teams

Former teams

Quebec Senior Lacrosse League (LCSQ)
Current teams

Former teams

Rocky Mountain Lacrosse League (RMLL)

Current teams

Former teams

Three Nations Senior Lacrosse League (TNSLL)
Current Teams

Former teams

West Coast Senior Lacrosse Association (WCSLA)

Senior C

West Central Lacrosse League (WCSLL)
Current Teams

Former Teams

Rocky Mountain Lacrosse League

Circuit Québécois de Crosse Senior (FCQ)
Current teams

Former teams

Junior A

Ontario Jr. A Council (OLA)

BC Junior A Lacrosse League (BCLA)

Rocky Mountain Lacrosse League (ALA)

Junior B

West Coast Junior Lacrosse League (BCLA)

Ontario Jr. B Council (OLA)

Rocky Mountain Lacrosse League (ALA)

Current Teams

Former Teams

Quebec Junior Lacrosse League - Ligue de Crosse Junior du Québec (FCQ)
Current teams

Former teams

Prairie Gold Lacrosse League (SLA)

East Coast Junior Lacrosse League

Iroquois Lacrosse Association (ILA)

Red River Lacrosse Association  (RRLA)

Junior C

Ontario Junior C Lacrosse League

Intermediate A

BC Intermediate Lacrosse League (BCLA)

Intermediate B

BC Intermediate Lacrosse League (BCLA)

Vancouver Island Intermediate Lacrosse League (BCLA)

Championships by province
The national championship trophies contested for at various levels of professional and amateur lacrosse in Canada:

1The Minto Cup was awarded as a senior title from 1901–1936

See also

 Ontario Lacrosse Association
 Rocky Mountain Lacrosse League
 Western Lacrosse Association

References

 
Canada
Lacrosse teams in Canada